Megumi-Toons is the popular English title for an autobiographical manga series written by voice actress Megumi Hayashibara. The art for the series was done by Sakura Asagi.

Megumi-Toons was originally serialized in Anime V magazine and has been published in a collection under the Japanese title . It was later reprinted in a small form, but with additional comics, by Kadokawa under their "Teens Ruby" imprint. In addition, a number of extra comics have appeared in random issues of Newtype.

The series is a series of vignettes about Hayashibara's life and career. It details her initial auditions, her training both as an actress and as a nurse, and the start of her singing career. It also includes scenes about her hobbies, a trip to America she took in 1996, and her family life and childhood. It ends with a vignette about her desire for a family, written before her actual marriage.

References
No-Name Anime:  Megumi-Toons